Cho Cho is the wife of Win Myint, the tenth President of Myanmar. She served as the First Lady of Myanmar from 2018 to 2021, when her husband was removed from office in a coup d'état.

Biography 
Cho Cho was born in Danubyu, Ayeyarwady Region, Burma to parents Tun Min and Win Kyi. She is the third daughter of a prosperous business family of Danubyu. Her family was owns Zabu Tun Cinema and Thapyay Nyo traditional medicine production. She attended at Basic Education High School No.6 Pathein. She met with Win Myint in their childhood. They have a one son and one daughter. Her daughter, Phyu Phyu Thin, is a senior advisor of City Mart Holdings and manager of Ocean Supercenter. Their son died at the age of 16 while Win Myint was being held at the Yemon Detention Centre, in Bago Region. She was overcome with grief as her husband was under detention and her only son died. She had to organize the funeral on her own and Win Myint was only allowed to attend the Buddhist ritual at their home seven days after the death of his son.

Without a job or income after the release of Win Myint, she had to sell her jewelry to support the family and provide schooling for their daughter Phyu Phyu Thin.

She has given unconditional support to her husband Win Myint, ever since the pro-democracy uprising in 1988. MP Khin San Hlaing commented on Cho Cho, "Daw Cho Cho was the perfect wife for a politician. She supported her husband’s political aspirations all the way with courage". She is also known as "Mother Cho" among younger NLD members.

Cho Cho became First Lady of the country when Win Myint became 10th President of Myanmar, following the resignation of Htin Kyaw as President of Myanmar on 30 March 2018.

References 

Living people
Year of birth missing (living people)
First ladies of Myanmar
People from Ayeyarwady Region